Fisher Meredith LLP was a law firm with offices in Holborn, London, United Kingdom that started in 1975. 

Fisher Meredith was consistently ranked in industry directories Chambers and Partners and Legal 500 for a number of areas, notably Civil Liberties and Human Rights, Social Housing, Family/Matrimonial, and Police Law.

Merger 
Fisher Meredith merged with the firm Bishop & Sewell on 14 August 2017. The combined practice now operates as Bishop & Sewell LLP

References

External links
 Fisher Meredith LLP
 Review in the Chambers Student Guide
 Fisher Meredith on Legal 500

Law firms based in London
1975 establishments in the United Kingdom